The Socialist Party was a political party in Morocco.

In the parliamentary election, held on 7 September 2007, the party did win 2 out of 325 seats.

It merged on 24 July 2013 into the Socialist Union of Popular Forces party.

2006 establishments in Morocco
2013 disestablishments in Morocco
Defunct political parties in Morocco
Defunct socialist parties
Political parties disestablished in 2013
Political parties established in 2006
Socialist parties in Morocco